The Islamic Jihad of Yemen was an al-Qaeda terrorist affiliate that claimed responsibility for the 2008 American Embassy attack in Yemen. The group also threatened future attacks against other embassies, including those of Saudi Arabia, the United Arab Emirates, and the United Kingdom.

The group released a statement saying, "We will carry out the rest of the series of attacks on the other embassies that were declared previously, until our demands are met by the Yemeni government." Meanwhile, on September 18, 2008, Yemeni authorities arrested 25 suspects allegedly connected to al-Qaeda. Foreign Minister Abou Bakr al-Qurbi said: "The attack on the U.S. Embassy was retaliation by al-Qaeda for the measures taken by the government to fight the terrorists." United States Department of State spokesman Sean McCormack said that "the multi-phased attack bore all the hallmarks of al-Qaeda." The government received an average of $40 million yearly in U.S. economic and military aid since 2000.

See also
Al-Qaeda in the Arabian Peninsula

References

Organizations based in Asia designated as terrorist
Groups affiliated with al-Qaeda
Jihadist groups in Yemen
Terrorism in Yemen
Yemeni Crisis (2011–present)